Gates is a British comedy television series shown on Sky Living. The series of 5 episodes ran from 14 August to 11 September 2012.

Plot
Helen (Joanna Page) & Mark Pearson (Tom Ellis) enroll their daughter, Chloe (Mari Ann Bull), in the Parkview Primary School and hijinks ensue as they try to fit in with the other parents at the school gates whilst dropping her off and picking her up from school.

Cast
 Joanna Page as Helen Pearson 
 Tom Ellis as Mark Pearson
 Catherine Shepherd as Sarah Howells
 Sue Johnston as Mr Andrews
 Tony Gardner as Aiden Howells
 Nick Mohammed as Ciaran
 Toby Wharton as Mickey
 Nadine Marshall as Melissa
 Ella Kenion as Mia
 William Andrews as Mr. Gould
 Mari Ann Bull as Chloe Pearson

Episodes

DVD
Gates was released on DVD on 17 September 2012.

International broadcast
In Australia, the series premiered on BBC First on 4 May 2015.

References

External links
 
 

2012 British television series debuts
2012 British television series endings
2010s British sitcoms
English-language television shows
Sky Living original programming